Xiaolan railway station is an elevated station of Guangzhou–Zhuhai intercity railway.

The station is located at the intersection of Min'an Nanlu and China National Highway 105, Xiaolan Town, Zhongshan, Guangdong, China. It started operation on 7 January 2011.

References

Zhongshan
Railway stations in China opened in 2011
Railway stations in Guangdong